Jim Roth may refer to:
 Jim Roth (politician) (born 1968), American politician from Oklahoma
 Jim Roth (musician) (born 1962), American guitarist, singer and songwriter
 Jim Roth (businessman), businessman, social entrepreneur and author